"Let's Get Dirty (I Can't Get in da Club)" is the first single released from Redman's 2001 album Malpractice. It is produced by Rockwilder and contains a highly synthesized beat and guest vocals from DJ Kool. It was slightly successful and scraped the edge of the Billboard Hot 100 chart. It was described by Allmusic editor Jason Birchmeier as a "nice moment" on Malpractice. It is featured on the 2005 compilation named Kiss Presents Hip Hop Classics 2. It also featured on the video games Tony Hawk's Pro Skater 3 and Def Jam: Fight for NY.

The song was later re-created by Christina Aguilera as "Dirrty". Her version was the lead single of her second album Stripped. That song also features a guest rap from Redman and was also produced by Rockwilder. "Let's Get Dirty" additionally features a remix featuring British cartoon group Gorillaz.

Single track list

A-Side
 Let's Get Dirty (I Can't Get In Da Club) (Radio Edit) (3:40)
 Let's Get Dirty (I Can't Get In Da Club) (LP Version) (4:09)

B-Side
 Let's Get Dirty (I Can't Get In Da Club) (Instrumental) (4:09)
 Let's Get Dirty (I Can't Get In Da Club) (Acapella) (4:09)

References

2001 singles
Redman (rapper) songs
Song recordings produced by Rockwilder
Songs written by Rockwilder
Def Jam Recordings singles
Songs written by Redman (rapper)
2001 songs